Valentina Isabel Costa Biondi (born 3 September 1995) is an Argentinian field hockey player. She plays with the Argentina national field hockey team, winning silver medal at the 2020 Summer Olympics.

Hockey career 
In 2019, Costa Biondi was called into the senior national women's team. She competed in the team that finished fourth at the 2019 Pro League in Amstelveen.

She won a gold medal at the 2019 Pan American Games in Lima.

References

Living people
1995 births
Argentine female field hockey players
Pan American Games medalists in field hockey
Pan American Games gold medalists for Argentina
Field hockey players at the 2019 Pan American Games
Medalists at the 2019 Pan American Games
Field hockey players at the 2020 Summer Olympics
Olympic field hockey players of Argentina
Olympic silver medalists for Argentina
Medalists at the 2020 Summer Olympics
Olympic medalists in field hockey
21st-century Argentine women